During World War II, the United States Army Air Forces (AAF) established numerous airfields in Oklahoma for training pilots and aircrews of AAF fighters and bombers or as major maintenance and supply centers.

Most of these airfields were under the command of Third Air Force or the Army Air Forces Training Command (AAFTC) (a predecessor of the current-day United States Air Force Air Education and Training Command). However other AAF commands, including Second Air Force, Air Technical Service Command (ATSC) and Air Transport Command (ATC) commanded airfields in a support roles.

It is still possible to find remnants of these wartime airfields. Many were converted into municipal airports, some were returned to agriculture and several were retained as United States Air Force installations and were front-line bases during the Cold War. Hundreds of the temporary buildings that were used survive today, and are being used for other purposes.

Major Airfields 

Army Air Forces Training Command
 Altus Army Airfield, Altus
 AAF Central Flying Training Command
 2508th Army Air Forces Base Unit
 Now:  Altus Air Force Base
 Chickasha Field, Chickasha 
 AAF Central Flying Training Command
 2549th Army Air Forces Base Unit
 Now: Chickasha Municipal Airport 
 Cimarron Army Airfield, Cimmaron
 AAF Central Flying Training Command
 2508th Army Air Forces Base Unit
 Now: Clarence E. Page Municipal Airport 
 Enid Army Airfield, Enid
 AAF Central Flying Training Command
 2518th Army Air Forces Base Unit
 Now:  Vance Air Force Base
 Frederick Army Airfield, Frederick
 AAF Central Flying Training Command
 2520th Army Air Forces Base Unit
 Now: Frederick Municipal Airport 
 Hatbox Army Airfield, Muskogee
 AAF Central Flying Training Command
 2557th Army Air Forces Base Unit
 Later: Hatbox Field (Closed)
 Miami Municipal Airport, Miami
 AAF Central Flying Training Command
 2556th Army Air Forces Base Unit
 Now: Miami Municipal Airport 
 Mustang Field, El Reno
 Central Flying Training Command
 2554th Army Air Forces Base Unit
 Now: El Reno Regional Airport 
 Ponca City Airport, Ponca City
 Central Flying Training Command
 323d Army Air Forces Flying Training Detachment
 Now: Ponca City Regional Airport 

Air Technical Service Command
 Tinker Field, Oklahoma City
 4136th Army Air Force Base Unit
 Now:  Tinker Air Force Base

Second Air Force
 Ardmore Army Airfield, Ardmore
 222d Army Air Forces Base Unit
 Later: Ardmore Air Force Base 
 Now: Ardmore Municipal Airport

Third Air Force
 Muskogee Army Airfield, Muskogee
 349th Army Air Forces Base Unit
 Now: Davis Field 
 Will Rogers Field, Oklahoma City
 Joint Use USAAF/Civil Airport
 348th Army Air Forces Base Unit
 Now Will Rogers World Airport 
 and  Will Rogers Air National Guard Base
 Woodward AAF
 Second Air Force until 1944
 Sub-field of Will Rogers Field
 354th Army Air Forces Base Unit
 Now: West Woodward Airport 

Air Transport Command
 Tulsa Municipal Airport, Tulsa
 582d Army Air Forces Base Unit
 Now: Tulsa International Airport
 and  Tulsa Air National Guard Base 

Note: The former Clinton-Sherman Air Force Base, now Clinton-Sherman Industrial Airpark, was originally Naval Air Station Clinton as acquired by the U. S. Navy in 1942.  NAS Clinton was closed at the end of World War II and turned over to the City of Clinton. It was on 15 September 1954 that the USAF leased the former NAS Clinton site from the City of Clinton to be used as an Air Force Base.

References
 Maurer, Maurer (ed.), Air Force Combat Units of World War II , Office of Air Force History, Washington, D.C., 1961 (reprint 1983) .
 Military Airfields in World War II - Oklahoma

 01
World War II
World War II
Airfields of the United States Army Air Forces in the United States by state
United States World War II army airfields